Édouard Ignacz Weiczorkiewicz (July 17, 1926 – October 30, 2010) was a French-born Canadian professional wrestler, better known by his ring name, Édouard Carpentier. Over the course of his career, Carpentier held multiple world heavyweight championships, including the NWA World Heavyweight Championship and the WWA World Heavyweight Championship. Nicknamed "The Flying Frenchman", Carpentier was known for his athletic manoeuvres including "back flips, cartwheels and somersaults".

Early life 
Weiczorkiewicz was born in 1926 in Roanne, Loire, France to a Russian father and a Polish mother. He joined the French resistance during World War II under the German occupation and was awarded the Croix de Guerre and the Croix du combattant medals by the French government at the close of the war. He moved to Montreal, Quebec in 1956 and became a Canadian citizen. He also became an all around athlete with gymnastic skills.

Professional wrestling career 

At the outset of his career, Carpentier wrestled in Europe as "Eddy Wiechoski".

Carpentier was a crowd favourite, one of the first wrestlers to delight fans with acrobatic leaps from the turnbuckles and a variety of other aerial manoeuvres such as the rope-aided twisting headscissors. He was always a fan favourite in his bouts and was matched against numerous villains, perhaps the most well known of whom was the legendary Killer Kowalski.

The highpoint of his career was his NWA World Heavyweight Championship reign from 1956 to 1957. He won the title in a disputed contest against Lou Thesz on 14 June 1957. Some NWA territories and officials recognized the disputed win as a legitimate title change, while others did not. This led to the split of the NWA and led to the creation of other organizations, all with their own world titles. He was later recognized as the first holder of the Omaha version of the World Heavyweight Championship. He eventually dropped the belt to Verne Gagne. The Omaha title was unified with the AWA World Heavyweight Championship in 1963.

Carpentier headlined Madison Square Garden three times in 1962 with tag team partner Bobo Brazil. They had two main events against Buddy Rogers & Handsome Johnny Barend; another against Rogers & Killer Kowalski. He teamed numerous times with Antonino Rocca, as well as with Vittorio Apollo. In solo matches at the Garden, he defeated Giant Baba, Skull Murphy, Magnificent Maurice, and Hans Mortier.

After his retirement, Carpentier operated a school for teaching professional wrestling skills. He also operated in the early 1980s as a babyface colour commentator, alongside heel play-by-play host Guy Hauray, for the Montreal-based Lutte Internationale, and then, together for the World Wrestling Federation, when the WWF bought the Montreal territory in 1985. They hosted the French edition of the WWF television show Superstars, sold to French-speaking countries. He was replaced by former Québécois wrestler Raymond Rougeau in 1992.

Death 
On 30 October 2010, Carpentier died of a heart attack at his home in Montreal, aged 84. He had also suffered a heart attack in 2000. Carpentier had been in poor health for many years, battered from his acrobatic, high-flying style.

Championships and accomplishments 

Atlantic Athletic Commission
Atlantic Athletic Commission World Heavyweight Championship (1 time)
American Wrestling Association
World Heavyweight Championship (Omaha version) (1 time)
International Wrestling Alliance
IWA World Heavyweight Championship (Chicago version) (1 time)
International Wrestling Enterprise
TWWA World Junior Heavyweight Championship (1 time)
Lutte Internationale
Canadian International Heavyweight Championship (2 times)
Canadian International Tag Team Championship (1 time) - with Mad Dog Vachon
Montreal Athletic Commission / International Wrestling Alliance
International Heavyweight Championship (Montreal version) (5 times)
National Wrestling Alliance
NWA World Heavyweight Championship (1 time)
North American Wrestling Alliance / Worldwide Wrestling Associates / NWA Hollywood Wrestling
NWA Americas Heavyweight Championship (1 time)
WWA World Heavyweight Championship (2 times)
WWA World Tag Team Championship (2 times) - with Ernie Ladd (1 time) and Bob Ellis (1 time)
WWA International Television Tag Team Championship (4 times) - with Sándor Szabó (2 times), Nick Bockwinkel (1 time) and Ernie Ladd (1 time)
Professional Wrestling Hall of Fame and Museum
Professional Wrestling Hall of Fame (class of 2010)
Stampede Wrestling
Stampede Wrestling Hall of Fame (Class of 1995)
Wrestling Observer Newsletter
Wrestling Observer Newsletter Hall of Fame (class of 1997)

References

External links 

 
 

1926 births
2010 deaths
Canadian male professional wrestlers
Canadian people of Polish descent
Canadian people of Russian descent
French emigrants to Quebec
French Resistance members
Naturalized citizens of Canada
NWA World Heavyweight Champions
Professional Wrestling Hall of Fame and Museum
Recipients of the Croix de Guerre 1939–1945 (France)
Sportspeople from Roanne
Stampede Wrestling alumni
20th-century professional wrestlers
Professional wrestlers from Montreal
NWA Americas Tag Team Champions
NWA Americas Heavyweight Champions